X Factor Indonesia is an Indonesian television music competition to find new singing talent; the winner of which receives a 1 billion rupiahs recording contract with Sony Music Indonesia. The second season aired on 3 April 2015 and is produced by RCTI in-house production and Fremantle Media Indonesia led by Fabian Dharmawan, RCTI's head of production, together with FM's SVP content and production, Glenn Sims. Robby Purba resumes his role as the host of the show alongside returning judges Ahmad Dhani, Rossa, and Bebi Romeo, while Anggun is replaced by Afgan due to her new commitment as a judge for Asia's Got Talent.

The competition was won by Jebe & Petty and Rossa emerged as the winning mentor for the second time.

Judges and hosts
Robby Purba was the first cast member confirmed to return for the second season in July 2014 during an interview with media. In January 2015, Anggun tweeted that she would leave X Factor Indonesia for an international project which was later revealed to be a judging role for Asia's Got Talent. Her replacement was later confirmed to be young pop star Afgan after RCTI released a series of promos featuring the judges for the second season, which include the remaining judges from the first season Ahmad Dhani, Rossa, and Bebi Romeo, on the late of March 2015.

Selection process

Auditions 

The producers' auditions began on January 14–15, 2015 at the Airlangga University in Surabaya, East Java. More producers' auditions were held on January 17–18 at the State University of Medan in Medan, North Sumatra, January 24–25 at the Jogja Expo Center in Yogyakarta, Special Region of Yogyakarta, February 3–4 at the Sasana Budaya Ganesha in Bandung, West Java and concluded on February 10–12 at the Balai Samudera in Jakarta, Jakarta Special Capital Region.

The contestants who passed producers' audition were later invited to the last set of auditions in Jakarta.  These auditions individually occur simultaneously before both the judges and a live studio audience; and with such audience in attendance able to applaud/cheer approval or disapproval and perhaps influencing the judges. The auditions were broadcast on April 3, 10, 17, and 24 episodes.

Bootcamp
119 acts reached the bootcamp in Jakarta, which includes three sets of challenge. On day one, each act has to perform an a cappella song for 30 second in front of the judges. Afterwards 43 acts were eliminated and the remaining 76 acts were grouped into pairs that will participate in a sing-off duel on the second day, similar to The Voice's battle round. The number of contestants were further reduced after the judges chose only 12 acts for each category, with the exception of only 7 acts for Groups category, to put through to the final challenge. In addition, the judges also gave a second chance for several contestants who were rejected as soloists to continue the competition as groups and formed 3 new groups (a girl duo, a mix duo, and a 5-piece girl group), thus increasing the number of acts from Groups category into 10. It was also revealed that Dhani would mentor the Overages, Rossa would mentor the Groups, Afgan would mentor the Girls, and Bebi would mentor the Boys. The first two challenges of bootcamp were broadcast on May 1 episode.

The final round of bootcamp follows the new format of six-chair challenge featured on the American and the British version of the show. Judges make decisions on whom to put through to judges' houses straight after each act has performed, with those getting a yes taking a seat in the final six chairs on stage. It is up to the mentor to decide, which act they want to take to judges' houses, but once all six spots are full, if the mentor wants to send another act through to the next stage it means they have to replace one of those who were previously given a yes. After the six-chair challenge, the number of remaining acts were narrowed down to 24. The six-chair challenge were broadcast on May 8 and 15 episodes.

Key:
 – Contestant was immediately eliminated after performance without switch
 – Contestant was switched out later in the competition and eventually eliminated
 – Contestant was not switched out and made the final six of their own category

The 24 successful acts were:
Boys: Ario Setiawan, Siera Latupeirissa, Yefta Richael, Aditya Wijaya, Ramli Nurhappi, Aldy Saputra
Girls: Julia Martinez, Riska Wulandari, Ismi Riza, Yohana Sarah, Clarisa Dewi, Ajeng Astiani
Overages: Rahmadani Nasution, Sulle Wijaya, Desy Natalia, Rani Klees, Angela July, Ditta Kristy
Groups: Mini Me, Chiara Duo, Jebe & Petty, VocaGroove, Classy, Jad n Sugy

Judges' home visits 
The judges' home visit was the last stage of the selection process. The final selection process was aided by an assistant per category. Vina Panduwinata joined Dhani at his private villa in Puncak, Judika joined Rossa at her private house in Jakarta, Maia Estianty joined Bebi at Sheraton Hotel in Tangerang, and Cakra Khan joined Afgan at Kemang in Jakarta. At judges' home visit each act performed a song they personally picked and performed it in front of their mentor and his/her assistant. The judges' home visits were broadcast on May 22 and 29 episodes.

Key
 – Wildcard winner

Key:
 – Contestant was eliminated
 – Contestant was made the final three of their own category and advanced to the gala live shows

Showcase and wildcard 
Showcase is the first live performance for the 12 acts who made it through to the Gala live show. Each mentor will introduce the acts who best they have to the public. Each act will perform one at a time to show their skills. At the beginning of showcase, it was announced that each judge could bring back one further act back as a wildcard. The public then voted for which of the four wildcards would become the thirteenth finalist. This left one judge with an extra act. Bebi chose Ario Setiawan, Afgan chose Ajeng Astiani, Rossa chose Chiara Duo and Dhani chose Rahmadani Nasution. Ajeng was revealed as the thirteenth act in the end of show.

Key:
 – Contestant was eliminated
 – Contestant was chosen as the wildcard later by mentor for their own category
 – Contestant won the wildcard and eventually advanced to the gala live shows as the 13th finalist

Contestants  

The top 13 contestants were confirmed as follows;

Key:
 – Winner
 – Runner-up
 – Third place

Gala live shows
The Gala live shows began on June 12, 2015. The shows are filmed at the Studio 8 RCTI, Jakarta.

Result summary 
Colour key

 Afgan was not required to vote as there was already a majority. However, he stated that he would have voted against Ajeng Astiani.
 Owing to the privilege of the guest judge's save in the ninth week, two acts were eliminated from the season's semi-final. Aldy Saputra and Ramli Nurhappi received the two fewest public votes and was immediately eliminated.

Gala live show details

Week 1 (June 12)
Theme: Mentor's Favorite
 

Judges' decisions to eliminate
Bebi: Jad n Sugy - Backed his own act, Siera Latupeirissa
Rossa: Siera Latupeirissa - Backed her own act, Jad n Sugy
Dhani: Siera Latupeirissa - Based on the final showdown performances
Afgan: Siera Latupeirissa - Gave no reason

Week 2 (June 19)
Theme: One Decade Hits Song

Judges' decisions to eliminate 
Dhani: Jad n Sugy - Backed his own act, Sulle Wijaya
Rossa: Sulle Wijaya - Backed her own act, Jad n Sugy
Afgan: Jad n Sugy - Gave no reason
Bebi: Jad n Sugy - Gave no reason

Week 3 (June 26)
Theme: Indonesian Hits

Judges' decisions to eliminate 
Rossa: Riska Wulandari - backed her own act, Classy
Afgan: Classy - backed his own act, Riska Wulandari
Dhani: Riska Wulandari - gave no reason
Bebi: Classy - wanted the result to be decided by the vote of the audience

With the acts in the bottom two receiving two votes each, the result was deadlocked and reverted to the earlier public vote. Classy was eliminated as the act with the fewest public votes.

Week 4 (July 3)
Theme: 100 Million Viewers Hits

Judges' decisions to eliminate 
Afgan: Sulle Wijaya - backed to his own act, Riska Wulandari
Dhani: Riska Wulandari - backed to his own act, Sulle Wijaya
Bebi: Riska Wulandari - based on the final showdown performances
Rossa: Riska Wulandari - based on the overall progresses

Week 5 (July 10)
Theme: Religious Songs 
Musical guest: Raisa - "Jatuh Hati"

Judges' decisions to eliminate 
Dhani: Aldy Saputra, backed to his own act, Sulle Wijaya
Bebi: Sulle Wijaya, backed to his own act, Aldy Saputra
Afgan: Sulle Wijaya, gave no reason
Rossa: Aldy Saputra, wanted the result to be decided by the vote of the audience
With the acts in the bottom two receiving two votes each, the result was deadlocked and reverted to the earlier public vote. Sulle Wijaya was eliminated as the act with the fewest public votes.

Week 6 (July 24)
Theme: Love

The sixth Gala Live Show was planned to air on July 17. But, because of public Islamic holiday of Eid al-Fitr which took place on July 18, the sixth week of Gala Live Show was postponed for a week to respect the Muslim viewers of the show which will celebrate it.

Judges' decisions to eliminate 
Dhani: Ismi Riza – based on the performance across of this week's shows
Bebi: Ismi Riza – based on the performances throughout the live shows
Rossa: Ismi Riza – went with her gut
Afgan was not required to vote as there was already a majority, but said he would have eliminated Ajeng Astiani.

Week 7 (July 31)
Theme: Childhood Songs
Musical guests: Nate Ruess - "Nothing Without Love" and "Just Give Me a Reason" with Shae

Judges' decisions to eliminate 
Dhani: Clarisa Dewi, backed to his own act, Angela July
Afgan: Angela July, backed to his own act, Clarisa Dewi
Bebi: Angela July, because Clarisa was his favourite since audition
Rossa: Clarisa Dewi, wanted the results to be decided by the vote of audience

With the acts in the bottom two receiving two votes each, the result was deadlocked and reverted to the earlier public vote. Angela July was eliminated as the act with the fewest public votes.

Week 8 (August 7)
Theme: Best Selling Records
Musical guests: Andana Wira - "Rusak Parah" and Boby Berliandika - "Mirasantika"

Judges' decisions to eliminate
Bebi: Ajeng Astiani, back to his own act, Aldy Saputra
Afgan: Aldy Saputra, back to his own act, Ajeng Astiani
Dhani: Ajeng Astiani, gave no reason
Rossa: Aldy Saputra, gave no reason

With the acts in the bottom two receiving two votes each, the result was deadlocked and reverted to the earlier public vote. Ajeng Astiani was eliminated as the act with the fewest public votes.

Week 9 (August 14)
Theme: Dangdut or Indian performances; Best pre-gala live shows performances
Musical guest: Ayu Ting Ting - "Suara Hati"

This week did not feature a final showdown and instead the act with the fewest public votes, Desy Natalia, was automatically eliminated. However, she was saved by the guest judge, Ayu Ting Ting. There were no eliminations that week all five acts will move on to next week but there will be a double eliminations next week.

Week 10: Semi-final (August 21)
Theme: Duets with Mentors; Cross-gender songs by each contestants
For the first time of the show, the semi-final featured five acts. Owing to the privilege of the guest judge's save in the ninth week, two acts were eliminated from the season's semi-final. The two acts with the fewest votes were automatically eliminated.

Final's Week: Round 1 (August 28)
Theme: Movie Soundtrack; Duets with Seniors from Season 1
Musical guest: The Overtunes - "Ku Ingin Kau Tahu"

Due to the grand final being in two parts, the public votes will be accumulated with the second finale week's votes and the grand total votes at the end of the final will decide which of the contenders will win. The fewest public votes on the middle of second finale week's performances will eliminate its contender immediately.

Final's Week: Round 2 (September 4)
Theme: Divas; Duets with Indonesian Superstar; and Winning singles (billed as "Grand Final")

Result Show (September 11)
Theme: Best free songs performances; Duets with former rival mentors 
Group and solo performances: All finalist - "Flashdance (What A Feeling)", Clarisa Dewi and Jebe & Petty - "Can't Hold Us", Fatin Shidqia - "Grenade" / "Aku Memilih Setia" and "Kaulah Kamuku" with The Overtunes, Angela July, Novita Dewi and Desy Natalia - "Problem", Agus Hafiluddin, Nu Dimension, Alex Rudiart and Isa Raja - "Habits (Stay High)", Afgan and Rossa - "Sabar" / "Tegar" / "Kamu Yang Kutunggu".
Musical guests: Fatin Shidqia, Novita Dewi, Nu Dimension, The Overtunes, Isa Raja, Alex Rudiart, Agus Hafiluddin, Afgan, and Rossa.

The winner announcement was held in Ecovention, Ecopark, North Jakarta.

Contestants who appeared on other talent shows
Jad n Sugy was a contestant on the first season of X Factor Indonesia where they were eliminated at the Judge Home Visit. 
Yosua Pichaba Sitompul was a contestant on the sixth season of Akademi Fantasi Indosiar where he was eliminated at the Top 4.  
Ajeng Astiani was a contestant on the first season of Mamamia Show where she was eliminated at the Top 4.
Rizky Inggar was a contestant on the first season of The Voice Indonesia and was on Team Sherina Munaf, where she was eliminated at the Top 16. 
Jessica Bennett of Jebe & Petty was a contestant on the third season of Indonesia Mencari Bakat where she was eliminated at the Top 10. 
Glenovian Armando Marcel of Vice Versa was a contestant on the third season of Indonesian Idol where he was eliminated at the Workshop.
Riska Wulandari was contestant on the eighth season of Indonesian Idol where she was eliminated at the elimination 1.
Ismi Riza was a contestant on the first season of Rising Star Indonesia where she was eliminated at the live audition.
Rani Klees, who was eliminated in the showcase in this season of X Factor Indonesia, would go on as contestant on the second season of The Voice Indonesia, but failed to turn any chairs in the blind auditions.
Janita Pangaribuan, Jansen Daniel, M. Habib, Julivan and Rizki Jonathan - Andry Fernando (2RF) would go on as contestant on the second season of The Voice Indonesia, but was eliminated in the battle rounds.
Irwan Saputra, who was eliminated in the bootcamp in this season on X Factor Indonesia, would go on as contestant on the second season of The Voice Indonesia, but was eliminated in the knockouts.
Danel Ferro and Natasya Misel, who was eliminated in the bootcamp in this season on X Factor Indonesia, would go on as contestant on the second season of The Voice Indonesia, but was eliminated in the Top 24.
Ario Setiawan, who was eliminated in the showcase in this season on X Factor Indonesia, would go on as contestant on the second season of The Voice Indonesia, but was eliminated in the Semifinal.

References

External links
 Official website
 X Factor Indonesia

Indonesia 02
Season 2
2015 Indonesian television seasons